Aellopus atratus is a species of dirt-colored seed bug in the family Rhyparochromidae, found in Europe and western Asia.

Subspecies
These three subspecies belong to the species Aellopus atratus:
 Aellopus atratus atratus Goeze, 1778
 Aellopus atratus nitidus (Kolenati, 1856)
 Aellopus atratus opacipennis (Reuter, 1885)

References

External links

 

Rhyparochromidae
Insects described in 1778